A takkanah (plural takkanot) is a major legislative enactment within halakha (Jewish law), the normative system of Judaism's laws. A takkanah is an enactment which revises an ordinance that no longer satisfies the requirements of the times or circumstances, or which, being deduced from a biblical passage, may be regarded as new. It is, therefore, the antithesis of the gezerah. The term is applied also to the institution provided for in the enactment.

Takkanot were enacted even in the time of the Second Temple, those of unknown origin being ascribed to earlier leaders, and they have been promulgated at all subsequent periods of Jewish history.

Introduction
Classical Jewish law granted rabbinic sages wide legislative powers. There are two powerful legal tools within the halakhic system:
 Gezeirah: "preventive legislation" of the classical rabbis, intended to prevent violations of the commandments
 Takkanah: "positive legislation", practices instituted by the rabbis not based (directly) on the commandments as such, e.g. rabbinical mitzvot.

However, the general term "takkanah" is used to refer to either gezeirot or takkanot.

Takkanot, in general, do not affect or restrict observance of Torah mitzvot. However, the Talmud states that in exceptional cases, the Jewish sages had the authority make a gezeirah even if it would "uproot a matter from the Torah". In Talmudic and classical halakhic literature, this authority refers to the authority to prohibit some things that would otherwise be biblically sanctioned (shev v'al ta'aseh). Rabbis may rule that a Torah mitzvah should not be performed, e.g. blowing the shofar on Shabbat, or blessing the lulav and etrog, on Shabbat. These gezeirot are executed out of fear that some might otherwise carry the mentioned items between home and the synagogue, thus inadvertently violating one of the 39 Melakhot, a greater sin than neglecting the banned mitzvah.

Another rare and limited form of takkanah involved overriding Torah prohibitions. In some cases, the sages allowed the temporary violation of a prohibition in order to maintain the Jewish system as a whole. This was part of the basis for Esther's relationship with Ahasuerus.

Biblical takkanot
Ascribed to Moses:
 the observance on holy days of the ceremonies peculiar to the festivals in question
 public Torah reading on the Sabbath, holy days, Rosh Hodesh, and Chol HaMoed
 the first blessing in Birkat Hamazon
 the eight priestly watches, four by Eleazar and four by Ithamar, which Samuel and David increased to twenty-four
 the seven days of wedding festivities for a virgin (the festivities for a widow's wedding were later ordained to last three days), and seven days of mourning for the dead

To Joshua:
 the second blessing in Birkat Hamazon
 ten regulations which, however, are not takkanot in the strict sense of the term

To Boaz, the ancestor of David:
 salutation in the name of God

To King David:
 increase of the eight watches of the priests to twenty-four (see above);
 the recitation of 100 blessings daily
 the third blessing in Birkat Hamazon

To King Solomon:
 the practise regarding the Eruv
 the washing of the hands before Kiddush, which Shammai and Hillel made obligatory for Terumah as well, while later authorities extended it to still other occasions
the regulation regarding entrance upon another's fields after the harvest (possibly enacted by Joshua also)

To the early prophets:
 The singing of Hallel on every important occasion, and especially after escape from danger
 the introduction of twenty-four divisions of laymen, corresponding to the twenty-four watches of the priests

To the Prophets before the destruction of Solomon's Temple: 
 payment of terumah and tithes in Babylon as well as in the Land of Israel
 payment of the second tithe ("ma'aser sheni") in the seventh year
 payment of it in Egypt, Ammon, and Moab likewise
 payment of the poor tithe ("ma'aser 'ani") even in the seventh year

To the Prophets after the destruction of the Temple:
 fasting on the Seventh of Tammuz, Tisha B'Av, First of Tishri, and Tenth of Tevet

To Ezra:
 the reading of ten verses of the Torah by three men on Monday and Thursday (Bava Kamma 82a)
 the reading of Leviticus 26:14-46 before Shavuot, and of Deuteronomy 28:15-69 before Rosh Hashanah
 sessions of the courts on Monday and Thursday
 the washing of clothes on Thursday
 the eating of garlic on Friday
 early rising on Friday morning for the purpose of baking
 the wearing of a girdle by women for reasons of modesty
 the obligation of the mikvah
 the law obliging peddlers to traverse the city in case they deal in articles necessary for women
 ritual baths for those who have become unclean (Keri)

Second Temple period (excluding biblical figures)
To the men of the Great Assembly:
 Introduction of blessings, prayer, Kiddush, and Havdalah
 the recitation of the "Shemoneh Esreh" on weekdays;
 The reading of Megillat Esther in the villages and unwalled cities on the Fourteenth of Adar and in walled cities on the following day; banquets on those days; and the giving of alms
 The introduction of seven blessings into the "Tefillah" on the Sabbath and holidays; the addition of nine benedictions to the mussaf prayer for the New Moon and Chol HaMoed, and of twenty-four on fast-days
 Recitation of prayers:
 recitation of a number of prayers
 period of duration of each prayer
 the offering of prayer daily
 three times on week-days,
 four times on shabbat, Yom Tov (festivals), fasts, and Rosh Chodesh (New Moons), and
 five times on Yom Kippur, the Day of Atonement
 addition of the "Magen Avot" from the Amidah on Friday evening
 bowing before and after the first blessing ("Avot") and before and after the penultimate blessing ("hoda'ah")

Ascribed to John Hyrcanus (135-106 BC):
 Decree forbidding the recitation of the prayer of thanksgiving, Viddui Ma'aser by any who have not paid the proper tithes at the end of the third year
 the appointment of officials to collect the tithes
 the use of rings in the shambles to force the animals to stand still
 prohibition of blacksmithing on Chol HaMoed

By the court of the Hasmoneans:
 Celebration of the Hanukkah festival, beginning on the 25th of Kislev
 Insertion of the name of God in legal documents (subsequently abrogated)

By the court of the priests:
 the daughter of a priest to be entitled to 300 zuzim under her marriage contract, and the widow of a priest to 100 zuzim
 the ketubah of a woman about to contract a levirate marriage to form a lien on the property of her first husband; and if he had no property, that of the levir to be appropriated
 the ketubah of a virgin to be of the value of 200 zuzim, and that of a widow or divorcée, 100 zuzim

By Shimon ben Shetach: 
 all the real estate of the husband to be entered in the marriage contract in favor of the wife, but the former may employ the dowry in his business;
 compulsory attendance at school
 the declaration that foreign glass is impure

By Hillel the Elder (75 BC - 5 AD):
 Introduction of the Prosbul
 the purchase-money of a house to be deposited in the Temple; the original owner may seize it by force in order to prevent its payment to the seller before the expiration of a year

By Gamaliel I (mid-1st century):
 The condemnation of 2,000 (subsequently increased) cubits of ground in which New Moon witnesses might freely move on the Sabbath
 the full names of the husband and the wife to be inserted in a bill of divorce
 the signatures of witnesses to the bill of divorce
 a widow may take the portion secured to her by her marriage contract only after all claims of the orphans have been fully satisfied
 a bill of divorce may be declared invalid only in the presence of the messenger who has brought it, or in the presence of the wife before she has received it

Tannaitic period
Most of the ordinances of Yohanan ben Zakkai were promulgated before the time of the destruction of the Temple in Jerusalem. These include:
 the New Moon witnesses must go to the place where the court assembles
 the testimony of such witnesses to be received at any time during the day
 they may not desecrate the Sabbath by traveling, except in Nisan and Tishri, the most important two months
 the shofar to be blown even on the Sabbath
 the lulav to be swung on all the seven days of the festival
 the consumption of new grain is forbidden during the entire day of the waving of the Omer
 priests may not wear sandals when they ascend the "dukan," or platform, to pronounce the blessing
 a convert must deposit a quarter-shekel in the treasury to be able to bring his sacrifice when the Temple shall be rebuilt (this was repealed by Johanan b. Zakkai himself)
 abolition of the ritual governing trials for adultery

Ascribed to Gamaliel II and the court of Yavne:
 Agriculture is permitted until the first day of the Sabbatical year

Ascribed to the court of Yavne:
 the fourth blessing of Birkat Hamazon, in memory of those who fell at Betar
 the insertion of the prayer against heretics in the time of Gamaliel, and, much later, of the "Adonai Sefatai" before the "Tefillah."

After R. Gamaliel's death the Sanhedrin of Yavne seems to have gone to Usha for reasons which are no longer known, and the grounds of its takkanot are equally obscure. In view of their ethical import, however, these enactments soon became binding. They were as follows:
 a man must support his minor children
 if a man transfers his property to his sons, both he and his wife enjoy a life income from it
 the gift of more than one-fifth of one's property for alms is forbidden
 a father must deal gently with his son until the latter reaches the age of twelve; but after that age he may be severe with him
 after a wife's death the husband may sell the property included in her dowry
 one who attacks an old man must pay one pound of gold for the injury
 elucidation of the seven doubtful reasons through which the terumah becomes unfit for use and must be burned 

These ordinances were enacted by the rabbis of the second generation of tannaim, Rabbi Ishmael being especially mentioned.

An ordinance is also extant which dates from the time called the period of religious persecution ("shemad"). When Hadrian issued his decree forbidding the Jews to observe their religion, the teachers, including R. Akiba, R. Tarfon, and R. Jose the Galilean, met in council and agreed that during the time of the persecution the Law might be transgressed in all respects, except as regarded the commands relating to idolatry, chastity, and morality, although this regulation was observed only superficially and only when necessary in order to deceive the Roman spies.

Three ordinances have been preserved which were promulgated by R. Jose ben Halafta (third generation of tannaim):
 during a funeral the mourners must remain standing while those who console them pass by
 women living in lonely places must associate with one another, so as not to attract the attention and evil desire of any man
 a child accompanied by its mother must not lag behind on the road, lest it come to harm

To R. Judah HaNasi:
 messengers must be sent every month to announce the new moon to the Diaspora
 concerning the purchase of fields among the Sicarii
 on menstruation

By topic

Regarding women
Ordinances from the period of the Mishnah and relating to women are as follows:
 an orphan girl married during her minority may leave her husband without a bill of divorce on attaining her majority
 the permission to marry a feebleminded girl
 a virgin should be married on a Wednesday
 various laws of purification
 the earnings of the wife belong to her husband
 the husband must pay all bills for his wife's illness
 a husband must ransom his wife from captivity
 a husband must defray the expenses of his wife's burial
 whatever is found by the wife belongs to her husband
 a widow is entitled to remain in the house of her deceased husband and to share in the income
 orphan girls share the income from their father's estate until they reach their majority
 male heirs succeed to the property of the mother, even after their father's death
 the daughter is entitled to a certain portion of her father's estate as her dowry
 a bill of divorce must be written and signed in the presence of the messenger who is to deliver it
 the date must be given in all legal documents
 in a bill of divorce the date must be given according to the state calendar; later it was also dated according to the era of Creation
 witnesses must sign a bill of divorce in the presence of each other
 introduction of the "geṭ mekushshar" to make divorce more difficult
 a woman becomes free even though only a single witness testifies to her husband's death

For the "preservation of the order of the world"
The more the Jews came in contact with the Romans and the Persians, the more they were obliged to mitigate the black letter law, and to introduce ordinances of the class characterized as necessary "for the preservation of the order of the world," or "for the sake of peace." The regulations of this type, like those already mentioned, date from the mishnaic period, and were promulgated for the sake of morality.

 A servant who is half free may compel his master to manumit him entirely; but he must give a note for one-half his value; and this debt must be paid
 the ransom paid for prisoners must not exceed the usual sum
 prisoners must not be allowed to escape
 Tefillin and other sacred articles must not be taken from Gentiles for excessive price
 if land in Israel is sold to a Gentile, the first-fruits must be forfeited
 if one divorces his wife for immorality, he may never take her back again (ib. 45a);
 on demand, one who has suffered injury is to receive reimbursement from the best of the estate; a creditor, from the medium; and a wife, with her marriage contract as security, from the worst
 if there is any property without encumbrance, nothing may be taken in payment of a debt from a field which has been mortgaged
 the least desirable portion of the real estate of orphans may be taken in payment of debts
 mortgaged property may not be applied to the pleasure or support of the wife
 one who finds anything shall not take an oath
 a guardian may not be compelled to take an oath
 accidental defilement of holy vessels either by a layman or by the priest in the Temple is punishable

For "the sake of peace"
 The call to the reading of the Torah to be made in a definite order
 the eruv (joint legal domain to insure free movement on Shabbat) may be arranged even with unoccupied houses
 the cistern nearest the river is to be filled first
 hunting includes robbery
 things found in the possession of one to whom they would not normally come imply theft
 the poor are permitted to pluck fruit from a neighbor's tree, but taking what remains on the ground is theft
 even the Gentile may share in the harvest gifts to the poor

Facilitating repentance
 One who steals a beam and builds it into his house need pay for the damage to the beam only
 if a robber or a usurer wishes to restore goods or money taken, they or it shall not be accepted
 purchase and sale by persons not regularly dealing in the wares in question are valid, in case such persons have reached years of maturity, in order that they may support themselves
 if one brings a stolen animal as a sin-offering before the theft is known, the sacrifice is valid

Business takkanot
Ordinances relating to legal proceedings were highly important so long as the Jews retained their own judicial system in the Diaspora. They are a form of business ethics. These include:

Ordinances relating to commerce
 It is permissible to take possession of real estate under certain conditions
 movables may be acquired only by actual possession, not by purchase
 movables when together with immovables are acquired by purchase or contract
 acquisition by a verbal conveyance of the three parties concerned is legal; this is not, however, explicitly declared to be an ordinance
 a verbal conveyance of property by one who is moribund is legally binding
 a convert may be the heir of a Gentile father
 even before taking possession a son may dispose of a part of his deceased father's property to defray the funeral expenses
 if one unwittingly purchases stolen goods, the owner must refund the money paid for them

Ordinances relating to civil law
 In actions for debt testimony may be accepted without further investigations
 actions for debt may be tried even by judges who have not yet received semicha (Sanhedrin)
 a contract may be authenticated only by the witnesses who have signed it
 on the strength of his contract a creditor may collect his debts either from the heirs or from those who purchase from the debtor

Ordinances on the oath
 If a laborer demands his wages and his employer asserts that he has paid them, the former must take an oath before he can obtain payment
 one who has been robbed must take an oath before he can recover his property
 one who asserts that he has been injured by another person must take an oath before he can recover damages
 if a manager asserts that he has paid an employee, and the latter denies it, both parties take the oath, and the employer pays them both
 if a contract is falsified by the wife or by the creditor, they must each take an oath before they can receive payment
 if an employer has only one witness to testify to the payment of a contract, the claimants must take an oath before they can receive their money
 money due from the property of orphans may be paid only under oath
 the payment of debts from mortgaged property may be made only under oath
 payment in the absence of the debtor may be made only under oath
 liquidation of a debt by means of property dedicated to the sanctuary may be made only under oath
 expenses incurred in behalf of the wife's property may be recovered only under oath
 if two parties each claim to have received the same piece of property at the same time, they must take oath to that effect
 if one asserts that a piece of property entrusted to him has been stolen from him, he must take an oath to that effect
 one who has unwittingly purchased stolen property must take an oath before he can recover his money
 if one has unintentionally damaged the property of another, he must take an oath to that effect before he can be released from the payment of damages

Relating to Passover
 chametz must be searched for with a light on the eve of the 13th of Nisan
 on Passover eve bitter herbs, mixed with haroset, must be eaten
 four cups of wine must be drunk
 those who partake must recline while eating, in token of freedom

Miscellaneous ordinances
 if a Sabbath follows a holiday, an eruv tavshilin is made in order that food for the Sabbath may be prepared on the holiday
 On the Sabbath and on holidays one may move freely within a radius of 2,000 cubits (see techum shabbat)
 the owner of lost property must bring witnesses to testify that he is not dishonest, and he must then describe his property before he is entitled to recover it
 lost articles to be announced in the synagogue

Post-Mishnaic ordinances
The making of new ordinances did not end with the completion of the Mishnah: enactments were promulgated also in the Amoraic, Saboraic, and Geonic periods of Jewish law, although their exact dates are no longer known. These include:
 the dowry of a wife and the movables of orphans may be taken in payment of debt
 movables may be attached for the dowry of orphan girls
 an oath is valid in cases involving real estate (Halakot Gedolot, xxii.
 no oath may be taken on the Bible
 criminal cases may be tried in Babylon
 the property of orphans may be taken for the marriage portion of the wife
 the debtor must take an oath if he is unable to pay
 the debtor must take an oath if he has obliged the creditor to do so
 a widow is obliged to take an oath only in case the property bequeathed to her by her husband is insufficient to discharge her marriage contract
 in legal trials both the principals and the witnesses must remain seated
 Wine made by Muslims is not "issur"
 the priest to be the first one called up to the Torah reading, preceding even the nasi
 permission to trade with Gentiles on their holidays
 the Fast of Esther
 an apostate may draw up a bill of divorce
 if a Samaritan betroths a female Jew, she must have a bill of divorce before any one else can marry her
  must be read on fast-days
 the interruption of the first and last three blessings of the Amidah by supplications
 the recitation of the morning blessings in the synagogue
 the recitation of the blessing Ahava rabbah in the morning and of Ahavat Olam in the evening
 the recitation of Baruch Adonai L'Olam in Maariv before the Amidah
 the recitation of the "Shema" in the Kedushah prayer
 introduction of the prayer beginning with the words כתר יתנו לך in "Kedushah" of musaf, and the prayers beginning with the words אז בקול רעש and ממקומך מלכנו in "Kedushah" of Shacharit of Sabbath
 the blessing for the bridal night
"Parashat ha-Musafim"

In modern times
The Conservative Movement also allows its leaders to issue takkanot today.  Examples of takkanot issued by the Conservative Movement in modern times include allowing women to count in a minyan and to serve as witnesses to a Beit Din, as well as removing restrictions on Kohen marriage. The Israeli Chief Rabbinate also adopted many such ordinances, though more moderate in character, among them various statutes regarding marriage and divorce.

The rabbis of Morocco held several conferences in the 1940s that issued statutes on various affairs.

References

 Its bibliography:
Frankel, Hodegetica in Mischnam, pp. 3, 4, 28, 29 et passim;
Rapoport, 'Erek Millin, s.v. Usha, Prague, 1852;
Jakob Brüll, Mebo ha-Mishnah, pp. 1–52, Frankfort-on-the-Main, 1876;
Bloch, Sha'are Torat ha-Taḳḳanot, Budapest, 1879–1902;
Brüll, Jahrb. viii. 61;
Aronius, Regesten, p. 115;
Rosenthal, Die Judengemeinde in Mainz, Speier, und Worms, p. 44, Berlin, 1904;
Kohut, Gesch. der Deutschen Juden, p. 121, Berlin, 1898;
Güdemann, Gesch. i. 44, 138, 243, note i.;
Weiss, Dor, iv., v., passim;
Perles, in Monatsschrift, 1865, pp. 84 et seq.;
Sefer ha-Eshkol, i. 9. Halberstadt, 1867;
Rosenthal, in Hildesheimer Jubelschrift, pp. 37–53, Berlin, 1890;
Neubauer, in R. E. J. xvii. 69;
Kerem Ḥamar, ii. 34a-36b, Leghorn, 1869;
Grätz, Gesch. iii. 111, 140, 212, 350; iv. 132, 157, 161; v. 336; vi. 180-182; vii. 21, 102; viii. 14, 49, 211, 268; ix. 451; x. 51, 69, 386.

See also
 613 commandments
 Conservative Halakha
 Mitzvah#Rabbinical mitzvot
 Rabbinic literature
 Responsa
 Shulkhan Arukh
 Torah
 Tanakh

Hebrew words and phrases
Jewish law